Malta competed at the 2022 World Aquatics Championships in Budapest, Hungary from 18 June to 3 July.

Artistic swimming 

Malta entered 2 artistic swimmers.

Women

References

Nations at the 2022 World Aquatics Championships
2022
World Aquatics Championships